Grodno Province may refer to several places:

Grodno Region, an administrative division of Belarus and Byelorussian SSR
Grodno Governorate, an administrative division of the Russian Empire